Worthing is a seaside town in West Sussex, England.

Worthing may also refer to:

Places
 Worthing, Christ Church, Barbados, a community in Christ Church, Barbados
 Worthing, Norfolk, UK
 Worthing, South Dakota, US
 Worthing railway station, in Worthing, West Sussex

Other
 Worthing (UK Parliament constituency)
 Worthing F.C., an association football club based in Worthing, West Sussex
 Worthing F.C. Women, an association football club based in Worthing, West Sussex
 The Worthing series, a series of science fiction works by Orson Scott Card
 , ships of the British Royal Navy
 , a steam ferry operating across the English Channel between Newhaven and Dieppe
 Helen Lee Worthing (1905-1948), American actress in the early 20th century
 Frank Worthing (1866–1910), American stage actor
 Jack Worthing, a character in Oscar Wilde's The Importance of Being Earnest
 Jason Worthing, a character in Orson Scott Card's The Worthing Chronicle and The Worthing Saga

See also
 Worthing High School (disambiguation)
 
 Worting (disambiguation)
 Worthington (disambiguation)